The Shelters is the eponymous debut album by American heartland rock band The Shelters. It was released digitally by Warner Bros. Records on June 10, 2016.

Track listing

References 

2016 debut albums
Warner Records albums